Lalrinliana Hnamte (born 29 April 2003) is an Indian professional footballer who plays as a midfielder for the ATK Mohun Bagan in the Indian Super League.

Career 
Lalrinliana Hnamte joined Pune City FC U-18 team, in 2018 and took part in the 2018 Hero I-League U-18. Then he moved to the Hyderabad FC reserves team and was with them till September 2021, before joining the East Bengal. He made his Indian Super League debut  for East Bengal on 21 November 2021, against Jamshedpur FC. He scored his first ISL goal against Chennaiyin FC in their 2–2 draw on 2 February 2022.

On 26th April 2022, it was announced by ATK Mohun Bagan, the arch rivals of East Bengal, that he is going to play for them from the upcoming 2022-23 season, signing a contract of 2 years.

Career statistics

References

External links 
 Lalrinliana Hnamte at ISL

Indian Super League players
East Bengal Club players
2003 births
Living people
Indian footballers
Association football midfielders